The City Hall of Pawhuska, Oklahoma, also known as the Osage Council House, was built in 1894. It was listed on the National Register of Historic Places in 1976.

It was built in 1894 to serve as the main government building of the Osage Nation. It replaced a previous Council House building which burned.

In 1974 it was home of city offices on the first floor, and the police department in the basement level. A chamber room for the City Council is on the second floor.

It is located at Main and Grandview Avenue.

References

City halls in Oklahoma
National Register of Historic Places in Osage County, Oklahoma
Buildings and structures completed in 1894